Boyer Glacier is a short tributary glacier situated  west of Index Point in the eastern part of the Mountaineer Range. It flows north into lower Mariner Glacier, Victoria Land. It was mapped by the United States Geological Survey from surveys and from U.S. Navy air photos, 1960–64, and named by the Advisory Committee on Antarctic Names for Jack W. Boyer, a U.S. Navy radioman at Hallett Station, 1962.

References 

Glaciers of Borchgrevink Coast